"Mojado" is a latin pop song a written by Guatemalan singer-songwriter Ricardo Arjona for his tenth Studio album, Adentro (2005). It was released in 2006 as the lead single from the album in Mexico, but the third single from the album overall.

Composition
"Mojado" has norteño and tejano music influences, mainly driven by the presence of Mexican band Intocable as featured artists on the song. Lyrically, the song revolves around immigration, telling the story of a man who abandons his country to another in search of a better quality of life.

Trackslisting

Charts

References 

Ricardo Arjona songs
Songs written by Ricardo Arjona
Sony BMG Norte singles
2005 songs